Antonio Rico Johnson  (born December 8, 1984) is a former American football nose tackle. He was drafted by the Tennessee Titans in the fifth round of the 2007 NFL Draft. He has also played for the Indianapolis Colts. He played college football at Mississippi State.

College career
He played defensive tackle at Mississippi Delta Community College for two years earning honorable mention All-America honors before transferring to Mississippi State University to play from 2003 to 2006.

Professional career

Tennessee Titans
The Tennessee Titans drafted Johnson as the 152nd overall pick in 2007 NFL Draft. He was given the number 96 by the Titans. On August 1, 2007, Johnson tore his ACL while participating in training camp drills and was forced to miss his entire rookie season.

Johnson spent the first nine weeks of the 2008 regular season on the Titans' practice squad.

Indianapolis Colts
Johnson was signed to the Indianapolis Colts' active roster from the Tennessee Titans' practice squad on November 4, 2008.

Tennessee Titans (second stint)
On May 13, 2013, Johnson agreed to terms with the Tennessee Titans, reuniting him with the team that drafted him. Johnson was on hiatus from football in 2014.

New England Patriots
On December 31, 2014, Johnson signed a future/reserve contract with the New England Patriots. Johnson was released on August 27, 2015.

References

External links
Indianapolis Colts bio
Mississippi State Bulldogs bio
Tennessee Titans bio
Antonio Johnson Instagram

1984 births
Living people
Sportspeople from Greenville, Mississippi
American football defensive tackles
Mississippi State Bulldogs football players
Tennessee Titans players
Indianapolis Colts players
New England Patriots players
Players of American football from Mississippi